Agnes is the self-titled debut studio album by Swedish singer and Idol 2005 winner Agnes Carlsson, released on 19 December 2005 by Columbia Records. The album debuted at number one on the Swedish Albums Chart and stayed there for two weeks. The lead single, "Right Here, Right Now (My Heart Belongs to You)", written and produced by Jörgen Elofsson, topped the Swedish Singles Chart for six weeks. The second single from the album, "Stranded", was less successful, peaking at number 27 on the Swedish Singles Chart.

Track listing
 "Stranded" (Niclas Molinder, Joacim Persson, Pelle Ankarberg, Kerima Holm) – 3:16
 "Emotional" (Fredrik Thomander, Anders Wikström) – 3:00
 "Right Here, Right Now (My Heart Belongs to You)" (Jörgen Elofsson) – 4:08
 "Forever Yours" (Fredrik Thomander, Anders Wikström) – 3:26
 "Get My Math" (Johan Åberg, George Samuelsson, C. Cox) – 3:04
 "I Believe" (Jones, A. Nova, Vincent Pontare) – 3:26
 "For Love" (M. Albertsson, N. Pettersson) – 4:06
 "What a Feeling" (G. Moroder, Irene Cara, K. Forsey) – 3:38
 "Now That I Found Love" (Mack, Tysper, Grizzly, Breitung) – 3:43
 "Let Me Carry You" (Jörgen Elofsson) – 4:01

Charts

Weekly charts

Year-end charts

Certifications

Release history

References

2005 debut albums
Agnes (singer) albums
Albums produced by Twin
Columbia Records albums
Covers albums